is a Japanese cross-country mountain biker. At the 2008 Summer Olympics, he competed in the men's cross-country, finishing in 46th place.  At the 2012 Summer Olympics, he competed in the Men's cross-country at Hadleigh Farm, finishing in 27th place. He rides for the Specialized Racing MTB team.

References

External links
Official site (in Japanese)

Management office (in Japanese)

Japanese male cyclists
Cross-country mountain bikers
Living people
Olympic cyclists of Japan
Cyclists at the 2008 Summer Olympics
Cyclists at the 2012 Summer Olympics
Cyclists at the 2016 Summer Olympics
1985 births
Asian Games medalists in cycling
Cyclists at the 2010 Asian Games
Cyclists at the 2014 Asian Games
Asian Games silver medalists for Japan
Asian Games bronze medalists for Japan
Medalists at the 2010 Asian Games
Medalists at the 2014 Asian Games
Cyclists at the 2020 Summer Olympics